Arturo Tizón Ibáñez (25 May 1984 – 16 January 2021) was a Spanish motorcycle racer. He was born in La Vall d'Uixó, Valencian Community. From 2005 to 2007, he competed in the 250cc Motorcycle World championship. He was the CEV Supersport champion in 2005.

Career statistics

Supersport World Championship

Races by year
(key)

Grand Prix motorcycle racing

By season

Races by year
(key)

References

External links
Profile on MotoGP.com
Profile on WorldSBK.com

1984 births
2021 deaths
People from La Vall d'Uixó
Sportspeople from the Province of Castellón
Spanish motorcycle racers
250cc World Championship riders
Supersport World Championship riders